Pinnamaneni Lakshmi Sahithi (born 1993 in Vijayawada, Krishna District, Andhra Pradesh, India) is an Indian chess player and winner of Woman International Master (WIM) FIDE title in 2007 at the age of 13. She was also the Asian Junior Runner up in 2006. In 2009, Lakshmi Sahithi was the National Women Challenger's champion in Nagpur, India and became the National Women open champion at the age of 15. She has won numerous other titles including two Commonwealth Champion titles and numerous Asian and National championship titles. A list of other notable titles is available below –

 Women open rated chess champion - Sangli, Maharastra in 2005
 Asian U-16 chess champion - Kyrgyzstan in 2005 (at the age of 12)
 National Sub Junior Champion consecutively in 2005 and 2006
 National U-18 silver medalist in 2004 (at the age of 11)
 Asian team silver – Singapore in 2004
 Commonwealth U-14 gold Mumbai, India
 4th place in World U-14 - 2006 in Bautumi, Georgia
 National Champion
 U-8 in 2000
 U-10 in 2002
 U-12 in 2004
 U-14 in 2006
 Asian Champion
 U-10 in 2001
 U-12 in 2003
 U-14 in 2005
 Commonwealth Champion
 U-10 in 2002
 U-12 in 2004

As of February 2017, her FIDE standard rating is 2108.
Lakshmi Sahithi is the third Telugu woman to win the Woman International Master (WIM) title. Others are Koneru Humpy, Dronavalli Harika, and Bodda Pratyusha.

References

External links
 

Indian female chess players
Chess Woman International Masters
Living people
People from Krishna district
Sportswomen from Andhra Pradesh
21st-century Indian women
21st-century Indian people
1993 births